Haseldorf is a former Amt ("collective municipality") in the district of Pinneberg, in Schleswig-Holstein, Germany. On 1 January 2017 it merged into the Amt Moorrege, which changed its name to Geest und Marsch Südholstein. The seat of the Amt was in Uetersen.

The Amt Haseldorf consisted of the following municipalities:

Haselau 
Haseldorf
Hetlingen

Former Ämter in Schleswig-Holstein
Uetersen